The list of ship commissionings in 1985 includes a chronological list of all ships commissioned in 1985.


References

See also 

1985